Titiwangsa is a federal constituency in the Federal Territories, Malaysia, that has been represented in the Dewan Rakyat since 1986.

The federal constituency was created in the 1984 redistribution and is mandated to return a single member to the Dewan Rakyat under the first past the post voting system.

Demographics

History

Polling districts 
According to the gazette issued on 30 October 2022, the Titiwangsa constituency has a total of 20 polling districts.

Representation history

Local governments

Election results

References

Federal Territories of Malaysia federal constituencies